Denya is a Southern Bantoid language of Cameroon in the Mamfe family. It has four dialects: Bajwo (Bajwa), Basho, Bitieku and Takamanda; they are divergent enough to perhaps be considered separate languages.

References

Mamfe languages
Languages of Cameroon